The Kenyan Premier League (KPL), officially known as the FKF Premier League and as the BetKing Premier League (BPL) for sponsorship reasons, is a professional league for men's association football clubs in Kenya. Standing at the top of the Kenyan football league system, the league was formed in 1963 under the Kenya Football Federation but is now controlled by the Football Kenya Federation. It is contested by 18 clubs and operates on a promotion and relegation system with the Kenyan National Super League. Tusker are the current champions having won the 2021–22 season.
 
The league was mostly stable until the late 1990s and since then its performance had been considered below average, with many of the league's clubs having little or no finances to support themselves. However, when SuperSport became an official league partner, the league has taken on a more serious role with teams becoming professional and the majority of the clubs managing to get kit sponsorships. This saw the level of competition improve compared to past periods.

Origin
Following constant wrangles between the then football governing administration and the eventual deteriorating of the National Football League, participating clubs opted out and decided to form a company that would see the smooth running of the league in a professional and transparent manner. In 2003, the Kenyan Premier League was created and registered as a limited liability company whose ownership was shared amongst all the sixteen participating clubs and was to be affiliated to the Kenya Football Federation.

The league was known as the Kenya National Football League from its creation in 1963 to 1996, the Kenyan Super League in 1973 and 1997 and, from 1998, the Kenyan Premier League.

Corporate structure
The Kenyan Premier League is operated and run as a private limited company incorporated in October 2003 under the Companies Act of Kenya. It is fully owned and managed by the 18 member clubs with each club being a shareholder. It is affiliated to Football Kenya Federation, which is also a shareholder and voting member of the KPL Board of directors. Non-voting members include the Kenya Football Coaches Association and the Kenya Football Referees Association.

The current CEO is Jack Oguda and Frank Okoth is the current COO and LNO. Okoth is also in charge of logistics.

Sponsorship

The improved level of competition and eventual attention given to the league by the fans has seen major companies in Kenya lining up to partner with clubs. At the moment, the league does not have a title sponsorship but it has a broadcasting deal with SuperSport. Umbro is the official referee kit supplier and is also the official ball provider.

On 21 August 2012 the Kenyan Premier League signed a KSh.170 million/= (US$2.02 million; £1.28 million stg; €1.62 million) deal with East African Breweries to rename the league to the Tusker Premier League, the most lucrative deal in Kenyan football history at the time. On 18 October 2012 the league signed a KSh.10 million/= (US$117,275; £73,242 stg; €90,052) deal with Puma, which made them the Official ball supplier for the league and its clubs with immediate effect.

On 6 August 2015, East African betting company SportPesa gained the naming rights to the league, signing a four-and-a-half-year deal with the KPL reportedly worth KSh.450 million/= (approx. US$4.36 million, £2.84 million stg. or €3.87 million) to rename the league to the SportPesa Premier League. As part of the sponsorship, a new trophy was revealed by SportPesa and the KPL on 30 October 2015, with Gor Mahia, the 2015 champions, set to be its first recipients and retain the previous trophy for good. The trophy was manufactured in Italy, weighs  and is made of brass. In 2018, Sportpesa ceased operating in Kenya and halted its sponsorship of the KPL.

On 24 November 2020, Football Kenya Federation (FKF) unveiled StarTimes as their official broadcasting partners for the FKF Premier League, through signing a seven-year deal worth US$1.1 million  (KSh.110 million/= per year).

Competition 
There are 18 clubs in the Kenyan Premier League. During the course of a season, traditionally from February to November but switched to August to May in 2018, each club plays the others twice (a double round-robin system): once at their home stadium and once at that of their opponents, for a total of 34 games. Teams receive three points for a win and one point for a draw. No points are awarded for a loss. Teams are ranked by total points, then goal difference, and then goals scored. At the end of each season, the club with the most points is crowned champion. If points are equal, the goal difference and then goals scored determine the winner. If still equal, the ordering is determined by their head-to-head records. If there is a tie for the championship, for relegation, or for qualification to other competitions, a play-off match at a neutral venue decides rank. The two lowest placed teams are relegated to the National Super League, with its top two teams promoted in their place. The 16th placed team squares off with the third-best team from the National Super League for the third promotion slot.

In 2018 the league switched from a Feb/Nov calendar to an August to May competition to bring it in line with other countries. The 2018/2019 season bridges the gap running from December 2018 to July 2019 after which the seasons will align with those of European nations.

2020–21 Clubs
The league's most popular teams are rivals A.F.C. Leopards and Gor Mahia.last title-winning season in 2018, while A.F.C. Leopards won their 12th league title in 1998.

Location Map

Previous winners

1963 : Nakuru All-Stars (Nakuru)
1964 : Luo Union (Nairobi)
1965 : Feisal FC (Mombasa)
1966 : Abaluhya FC (Nairobi)
1967 : Abaluhya FC (Nairobi)
1968 : Gor Mahia (Nairobi)
1969 : not played
1970 : Abaluhya FC (Nairobi)
1971 : not played
1972 : Kenya Breweries (Nairobi)
1973 : Abaluhya FC (Nairobi)
1974 : Gor Mahia (Nairobi)
1975 : Luo Union (Nairobi)
1976 : Gor Mahia (Nairobi)
1977 : Kenya Breweries (Nairobi)
1978 : Kenya Breweries (Nairobi)
1979 : Gor Mahia (Nairobi)
1980 : AFC Leopards (Nairobi)
1981 : AFC Leopards (Nairobi)
1982 : AFC Leopards (Nairobi)
1983 : Gor Mahia (Nairobi)
1984 : Gor Mahia (Nairobi)
1985 : Gor Mahia (Nairobi)
1986 : AFC Leopards (Nairobi)
1987 : Gor Mahia (Nairobi)
1988 : AFC Leopards (Nairobi)
1989 : AFC Leopards (Nairobi)
1990 : Gor Mahia (Nairobi)
1991 : Gor Mahia (Nairobi)
1992 : AFC Leopards (Nairobi)
1993 : Gor Mahia (Nairobi)
1994 : Kenya Breweries (Nairobi)
1995 : Gor Mahia (Nairobi)
1996 : Kenya Breweries (Nairobi)
1997 : Utalii FC (Ruaraka)
1998 : AFC Leopards (Nairobi)
1999 : Tusker FC (Nairobi)
2000 : Tusker FC (Nairobi)
2001 : Oserian Fastac FC (Naivasha)
2002 : Oserian Fastac FC (Naivasha)
2003 : Ulinzi Stars (Nakuru)
2004 : Ulinzi Stars (Nakuru)
2005 : Ulinzi Stars (Nakuru)
2006 : SoNy Sugar (Awendo)
2007 : Tusker (Nairobi)
2008 : Mathare United (Nairobi)
2009 : Sofapaka (Nairobi)
2010 : Ulinzi Stars (Nakuru)
2011 : Tusker (Nairobi)
2012 : Tusker (Nairobi)
2013 : Gor Mahia (Nairobi)
2014 : Gor Mahia (Nairobi)
2015 : Gor Mahia (Nairobi)
2016 : Tusker (Nairobi)
2017 : Gor Mahia (Nairobi)
2018 : Gor Mahia (Nairobi)
2018-19 : Gor Mahia (Nairobi)
2019-20 : Gor Mahia (Nairobi)
2020-21 : Tusker (Nairobi)
2021-22 : Tusker (Nairobi)

Source: RSSSF – Kenya – List of champions

Total titles won

Top scorers in past seasons

The league record for most goals scored in one season is currently held by Maurice Ochieng, who completed the 1976 season with 26 goals for Gor Mahia. His former teammate, Joe Kadenge, praised him as a lethal striker in front of goal.

[*]Award was shared during that season

See also
 Kenyan Women's Premier League
 Kenyan football league system

References

External links
 Kenyan Premier League – Official website
 Kenyan Premier League at FIFA
 Kenya – List of Champions, RSSSF.com

 
1
Kenya